Joseph Chase may refer to:

 Joseph Cummings Chase (1878–1965), American artist
 J. Smeaton Chase (1864–1923), English-born American author, traveler and photographer